Helmut Wilhelm (12 April 1946 – 24 September 2022) was a German judge and politician.

Wilhelm died in Amberg on 24 September 2022, at the age of 76.

References

1946 births
2022 deaths
German judges
Members of the Bundestag for Bavaria
Members of the Bundestag 1994–1998
Members of the Bundestag 1998–2002
Alliance 90/The Greens politicians
University of Würzburg alumni
University of Regensburg alumni
Recipients of the Cross of the Order of Merit of the Federal Republic of Germany
People from Regensburg